Richard Austin Quest (born 9 March 1962) is a British journalist and non-practising barrister working as a news anchor for CNN International. He is also an editor-at-large of CNN Business.

He anchors Quest Means Business, the five-times-weekly business program and fronts the CNN shows Business Traveller, The Express and Quest's World of Wonder.

Early life and education
Quest is a native of Liverpool, Lancashire (now Merseyside), England, having been born and partly brought up there. He is Jewish.

He was educated at the state comprehensive Roundhay School in Leeds, followed by Airedale and Wharfedale College and the University of Leeds, where he earned a Bachelor of Laws in 1983, and was called to the Bar. He spent the 1983–1984 academic year in the United States at Vanderbilt University in Nashville, Tennessee, where he was the news director of WRVU.

Career

Quest became a trainee journalist at the BBC in 1985, joining its financial section in 1987, and moving to New York City in 1989 to become the BBC's North American business correspondent.

Quest later worked for the BBC from the United States as part of its then-fledgling BBC News 24 channel. He was the business correspondent reporting on, and discussing the world stock market in a regular segment entitled World Business Report usually aired between 2:00 am and 3:00 am (GMT), a programme that he presented alongside Paddy O'Connell. He was also an occasional presenter on the BBC's early-morning Business Breakfast programme.

Quest joined CNN in 2001 for the launch of Business International. Since this time Quest has covered a variety of different events for CNN, amongst others an analysis of the U.S. elections as American Quest and the start of the circulation of euro banknotes and coins on 1 January 2002 and the last official commercial flight of Concorde. He has also headed up CNN's coverage of several events involving the British Royal Family.

In 2006, Quest turned down an opportunity to join Al Jazeera English news channel, the English language version of al-Jazeera, "on the grounds that being gay and Jewish might not be suitable".

On 9 April 2015, Quest was announced as the host of the ABC game show 500 Questions. He was replaced by Dan Harris for the show's second season.

On 8 June 2015, Quest appeared as a contestant on The CNN Quiz Show: The Seventies Edition special produced by Eimear Crombie, along with his partner Brooke Baldwin playing for StandUp for Kids.

Quest is also an Aviation Correspondent for CNN, and extensively covered the story of Malaysia Airlines Flight 370, which disappeared on 8 March 2014. Quest later wrote the book, The Vanishing of Flight MH370: The True Story of the Hunt for the Missing Malaysian Plane, published by Penguin Random House on 8 March 2016.

Personal life
In 2008, Quest was arrested in New York City's Central Park "with some drugs in his pocket, a rope around his neck that was tied to his genitals, and a sex toy in his boot." Quest admitted being in possession of crystal methamphetamine, a controlled substance.

On 26 June 2014, Quest described his past experience as a closeted gay man on his CNN television programme Quest Means Business.

Quest tested positive for COVID-19 in April 2020, later saying it had developed into long COVID.

See also
 Broadcast journalism
 LGBT culture in New York City
 List of LGBT people from New York City
 New Yorkers in journalism

References

External links

 
CNN staff biography
CNN Business Traveller
CNN Quest
 

1962 births
20th-century English people
21st-century English people
Living people
Alumni of the University of Leeds
BBC newsreaders and journalists
CNN people
English expatriates in the United States
English Jews
English television journalists
Gay men
Journalists from New York City
People educated at Roundhay School
British LGBT broadcasters
LGBT Jews
British LGBT journalists
Television presenters from Liverpool
Vanderbilt University alumni
English people of Jewish descent